Igreja Matriz de São Martinho de Candoso is a church in Portugal. It is classified as a National Monument.

Churches in Braga District
National monuments in Braga District